Athletics at the 2009 Southeast Asian Games, was held at the  in Vientiane, Laos from 13 December to 17 December. A total of 45 events were contested.

Medal summary

Results
The full results can be found here.

Men

Women

References
General
Robinson, Javier Clavelo (2009-12-19). Thailand confirms regional dominance at 25th South East Asian Games. IAAF. Retrieved on 2009-12-20.
Specific